Hjálmar Stefánsson (born 5 January 1996) is an Icelandic basketball player for Valur of the Úrvalsdeild karla and a member of the Icelandic national basketball team. In 2022, he won his first Icelandic championship.

Career
Hjálmar came up through the junior ranks of Haukar and started his senior team career during the 2013–14 season. In 2018–19, he averaged a career highs of 13.5 points and 7.5 rebounds. In August 2020, Hjálmar signed with Liga EBA club Aquimisa Carbajosa where he met fellow Icelander Tómas Þórður Hilmarsson. In February 2021, it was reported that Hjálmar would leave Carbajosa and return to Iceland to join Valur, much to the displeasure of Haukar who threatened legal action as they believed that he was still under contract obligations to not to play for any other team in Iceland except them until after the season. On 27 February, the Icelandic Basketball Association confirmed his transfer from Carbajosa to Valur. On 5 March it was reported that Haukar would not pursue a legal case in the matter.

In 2022, he won the Icelandic championship with Valur.

On 2 October 2022, he won the Icelandic Super Cup with Valur. On 14 January 2023, he won the Icelandic Cup after Valur defeated Stjarnan in the Cup final.

National team career
Hjálmar debuted for the Icelandic national team in June 2018. He was a member of the team that won silver at the 2019 Games of the Small States of Europe.

References

External links
Icelandic statistics at Icelandic Basketball Association
Profile at Proballers.com

1996 births
Living people
Forwards (basketball)
Hjálmar Stefánsson
Hjálmar Stefánsson
Hjálmar Stefánsson
Hjálmar Stefánsson
Hjálmar Stefánsson